Hiroshi Kawabuchi (August 15, 1883 – October 1, 1946) was a Japanese politician who served as governor of Hiroshima Prefecture from July 1929 to May 1931. He was governor of Fukushima Prefecture (1925-1927) and Fukuoka Prefecture (1931). He was mayor of Kōchi, Kōchi from 1936 to 1941.

References

Governors of Hiroshima
1883 births
1946 deaths
Japanese Home Ministry government officials
Governors of Fukushima Prefecture
Governors of Fukuoka Prefecture